WS-Context is a web services specification developed by OASIS (organization). It is part of the WS-CAF suite. Its purpose is to provide a means to reference a shared context, which relates a set of interactions between web services (termed an activity). This context provides details of the application-specific execution environment for these services, and is typically included in the header of SOAP message.  Contexts may be passed by value, or by reference, in which case they are retrieved using a Context Manager service.  A Context Service is described, which allows management of activities by means of the begin and complete operations, which create and destroy the context respectively.

References
 Little, M., Newcomer, E., Pavlik, G. (Eds) Web Services Context Specification Version 1.0 OASIS, 2007 http://docs.oasis-open.org/ws-caf/ws-context/v1.0/wsctx.html retrieved 2008-01-03

Web service specifications